The Infiernillo Dam ("Little hell"), also known as Adolfo López Mateos Dam, is an embankment dam on the Balsas River near La Unión, Guerrero, Mexico. It is on the border between the states of Guerrero and Michoacán. The dam supports a hydroelectric power station containing six turbine-generators for a total installed capacity of 1,120 MW. Its first generator was operational on January 25, 1965.

Placement of the dam embankment began in August 1962, and on December 7, 1963, the dam was topped off. The diversion tunnels were closed and the reservoir began to fill on June 15, 1964.

References

Dams in Mexico
Hydroelectric power stations in Mexico
Embankment dams
Dams completed in 1963
Balsas River